Hettinger is a surname. Notable people with the surname include:

Catherine Hettinger, American engineer and toy inventor
Edward Gerard Hettinger (1902-1996), American Catholic bishop
Franz Hettinger (1819–1890), German Catholic theologian
Steve Hettinger, former Mayor of Huntsville, Alabama

German-language surnames